George Telegraph Sports Club is an Indian multisports club based in Kolkata, West Bengal, that competes in the Calcutta Football League, the top tier state football league in West Bengal. The club plays all their home matches at the Rabindra Sarobar Stadium. They have also competed in the I-League 2nd Division, the second tier of Indian football league system.

Founded in 1925 and affiliated with the Indian Football Association (IFA), the club is known by its nickname "Georgians".

History
The club was founded by Haripada Dutta in 1925, and A. L. Corbett, principal of the George Telegraph Institute, became first chairman. They started out on the 4th division of the Calcutta League and after 21 years they were finally promoted to the 1st division of Calcutta Football League beating Rajasthan Athletic Club 3–1. In the same year, they reached the final of the IFA Shield, but due to the anti-British riots the final couldn't be held. Instead of declaring them as joint winners with Mohun Bagan AC, the entire tournament was scrapped. Some of notable Indian footballers including Rajen Ghosh, Monimohan Ghosh, Sheoo Mewalal, Sushil Bhattacharya, Runu Guha Thakurata, Monoranjan Bhattacharya, Satyajit Chatterjee, Aloke Mukherjee, Shasthi Duley, appeared with George Telegraph.

They stayed at the top flight for 66 years but in 2002 and 2003, they suffered back-to-back demotions. Then again they got promoted twice in two successive years and since then they have been staying in the top flight. In 2004, they emerged as the runners-up of the All Airlines Gold Cup. Their first participation in the I-League 2nd Division was in 2009, where they finished 4th, behind Oil India FC and were eliminated in the group stage.  Therefore, George Telegraph was unable to qualify for the I-League, then top tier of football in India. In 2013, they again got a chance to play in I-League 2nd Division, which became their second season.

In 2020, the George Telegraph emerged as the runners-up in the prestigious IFA Shield tournament, the third oldest association football tournament in the world, losing to 2–1 to the I-League side Real Kashmir FC. They reached the semi-finals of 2021–22 Calcutta Premier Division in November 2021, but their campaign ended with a 1–0 loss to Railway FC.

Home stadium

George Telegraph plays their home matches of Calcutta Premier Division at the Rabindra Sarobar Stadium, which has a capacity of nearly 20,000 spectators.

They also use Barasat Vidyasagar Krirangan for some of their home games. It has Artificial turf and achieved a two-star rating from FIFA.

Players

First-team squad

Club officials

Personnel
 General secretary: Subrata Dutta  
 Joint secretary : Anirban Dutta
 Executive secretary: Adhiraj Dutta  
 Team manager: Sabyasachi Sarkar

Coaching and medical staff
 Head coach: Goutam Ghosh
 Assistant coach: Samar Deb
 Goalkeeping coach: Jagadish Ghosh
 Physio: Murtuza Sabuwala

Honours

League
CFL Senior Division B
Champions (3): 1985, 1990, 2017

Cup
 IFA Shield
Runners-up (1): 2020
 All Airlines Gold Cup
Runners-up (1): 2004
Darjeeling Gold Cup
Champions (1): 1977
Kohima Royal Gold Cup
Runners-up (1): 2004

Other department

Men's cricket
The club has its men's cricket section, which is under the jurisdiction of Cricket Association of Bengal (CAB). The team participates in First Division League, J.C. Mukherjee T-20 Trophy and other regional tournaments.

See also
 Football in Kolkata
 List of football clubs in Kolkata
 Calcutta Football League

References

External links

Sports clubs in India
Association football clubs established in 1925
Football clubs in Kolkata
1925 establishments in India
Multi-sport clubs in India
I-League 2nd Division clubs